Sugar Creek Township is one of eleven townships in Montgomery County, Indiana, United States. As of the 2010 census, its population was 448 and it contained 167 housing units.

History
William Fisher Polygonal Barn was listed on the National Register of Historic Places in 1993.

Geography

Unincorporated towns
 Bowers at

Cemeteries
The township contains these four cemeteries: Bowers, Clouser, Peterson and Rice.

School districts
 North Montgomery Community School Corporation

Political districts
 Indiana's 4th congressional district
 State House District 41
 State Senate District 23

References
 
 United States Census Bureau 2008 TIGER/Line Shapefiles
 IndianaMap

External links
 Indiana Township Association
 United Township Association of Indiana
 City-Data.com page for Sugar Creek Township

Townships in Montgomery County, Indiana
Townships in Indiana